"Western Union" is a 1967 song by the American rock band the Five Americans. The single peaked at number 5 on the Billboard Hot 100 in April 1967. It also reached number 7 on the Cash Box Top 100 Singles chart that same month.

Origins
In a March 1967 interview that appeared in Michael Oberman's "Top Tunes" column in the Evening Star newspaper (Washington, D.C.), Norman Ezell, guitarist for the group, explained how they came up with "Western Union."  "Mike Rabon, our lead guitar player, was just fooling around with his guitar when he came up with a unique sound," Norman said. "It sort of reminded us of a telegraph key. That's when we decided to write 'Western Union.

The song tells of a Dear John letter being communicated by telegram, a service of Western Union. The lyrics “Western Union man, bad news in his hand” were reminiscent of death notification telegrams hand-delivered to the families of soldiers killed in war, still in use at the time of this song's release.

Chart performance

Weekly charts

Year-end charts

Cover versions
In 1967, The Strangers' recording reached number 30 in Australia.

References

1967 songs
1967 singles
The Searchers (band) songs